"Tenth Avenue Freeze-Out" is the second song on Bruce Springsteen's breakthrough album Born to Run, released in 1975.

Content
The song tells the story of the formation of the E Street Band. The meaning of the title is unclear. Even Springsteen himself says in the Born to Run documentary Wings for Wheels: The Making of Born to Run: "I still have no idea what it means. But it's important."

The song's protagonist, "Bad Scooter", is a pseudonym for Springsteen himself (as indicated by the initials they share). In the third verse, "Big Man joined the band" refers to Clarence Clemons, the band's long-time saxophonist.

As stated by Springsteen in the Wings for Wheels documentary, the idea for the composition of the horn intro was Steven Van Zandt's. Despite all of this, the single was a chart dud, getting no higher than #83 on the Billboard Hot 100 in early 1976, and #82 in Canada.  Record World said of the single release that "to find out what [[Springsteen's] all about on vinyl, listen to this disc." However, it has always had a strong following on album-oriented rock radio and amongst Springsteen's fan base.

Personnel
According to authors Philippe Margotin and Jean-Michel Guesdon:

Bruce Springsteen – vocals, electric guitar, brass arrangements
Garry Tallent – bass
Max Weinberg – drums
Roy Bittan – piano
Clarence Clemons – tenor saxophone
Randy Brecker – trumpet, bugle
Michael Brecker – tenor saxophone
Dave Sanborn – baritone saxophone
Wayne Andre – trombone
Steve Van Zandt – brass arrangements

Live performance history

"Tenth Avenue Freeze-Out" has become a staple of Springsteen's E Street Band concert tours, with regular appearances from the 1975 and on the Born to Run tours through the 1984 legs of the Born in the U.S.A. Tour, with one of the latter documented on the later Live/1975–85, and the 1988 Tunnel of Love Express.  It then returned with a featured regular spot on the 1999–2000 Reunion Tour, often used as an introduction of the band. An extended 20-minute version was captured on the subsequent Bruce Springsteen & The E Street Band: Live in New York City release, and was frequently played during most of the legs of the 2007–2008 Magic Tour and during the 2009 Working on a Dream Tour. It opened the four-song set at Springsteen and the band's high-profile half-time appearance at Super Bowl XLIII, which included Springsteen pointing out that the verse about "the Big Man" joining the band was the important part of the song.

A slower version of this song was played during the Born to Run tours, on December 31, 1975, in Philadelphia.

After Clemons' death, Springsteen used the song as a memorial/tribute to both him and the late Danny Federici on the Wrecking Ball Tour, the first E Street Band tour without Clemons. During the song's third verse of "Big Man joined the band", Springsteen paused the song where Clemons' sax solo would traditionally be performed while a video of Clemons and Federici played on the stage screens. On the High Hopes and River 2016 tours, Springsteen removed the pause from performances of the song, but kept the video tribute.

Springsteen joined his longtime friend Billy Joel on stage at Madison Square Garden on July 18, 2018 to perform the song (along with "Born to Run") for Joel's 100th appearance at MSG.

References

External links
Official lyrics
What is a Tenth Avenue Freeze-Out? Mystery solved? Extrageographic Magazine

1975 singles
1976 singles
Bruce Springsteen songs
Songs written by Bruce Springsteen
Song recordings produced by Jon Landau
Song recordings produced by Mike Appel
Columbia Records singles
1975 songs
Songs based on actual events
Song recordings produced by Bruce Springsteen